T. Babbitt Parlee (March 13, 1914 – January 22, 1957) was a lawyer and political figure in New Brunswick, Canada.

Biography

Early life and education
He was born in Sussex, New Brunswick, the son of W.K.C. Parlee and Jennie H. Babbit. He was educated at the University of New Brunswick and Dalhousie University. In 1948, Parlee married Evelyn Moran.

Political career
He served on city council from 1944 to 1948 and was mayor of Moncton from 1950 to 1952. He served as president of the province's Executive Council in 1952. That year, as a Progressive Conservative, he and his running mate Joseph W. Bourgeois won two City of Moncton seats in the Legislative Assembly of New Brunswick, defeating incumbent C. H. Blakeney and Claudius Leger. After the election, in 1954 he was named Minister of Municipal Affairs.

Death
On January 23, 1957, Parlee and two other men died when their plane crashed in Kent County during a snow storm. He was flying from Fredericton to Moncton. The wreckage was discovered that May. Parlee Beach was named after him in 1959.

References 

 Canadian Parliamentary Guide, 1956, PG Normandin
  

1914 births
1957 deaths
Mayors of Moncton
University of New Brunswick alumni
Dalhousie University alumni
Progressive Conservative Party of New Brunswick MLAs
Victims of aviation accidents or incidents in Canada
Victims of aviation accidents or incidents in 1957
Accidental deaths in New Brunswick